Antonio Ortega may refer to:

Antonio Ortega (colonel), Spanish Republican military leader and acting president of football club Real Madrid between 1937 and 1938
Antonio Ortega (footballer), Panamanian footballer who currently plays for San Francisco F.C.
Antonio Carlos Ortega, Spanish Olympic handball player
Jose Antonio Ortega Ruiz, author of GNU MDK: The MIX Development Kit